Madden NFL '96 is a football video game designed for the 1995 NFL season, licensed by the NFL. Publisher Electronic Arts intended for it to be the first licensed NFL game for the PlayStation, but the PlayStation version was delayed and ultimately cancelled, with the game being published only for previous-generation consoles, PCs, and handhelds. Compared to previous Madden NFL games, the AI has been boosted and can now hurry in two-minute drill situations, spike the ball, and cover the receivers with better efficiency. In addition to the 16-bit console and portable versions, a DOS version was also released under the title of Madden NFL Football: Limited Edition in 1996.

The game was well-received by critics, with the improved A.I. garnering the most praise. It was the last to explicitly be endorsed by the NFL on Fox, although a knock-off/rendition of the NFL on Fox theme would continue to be used in Madden for several years afterward.

Gameplay
The Create a Player feature is added, which includes position-specific mini-games that determine the ability of the player.

The game is the first in the Madden series to include secret "classic" teams.  Each time a player wins Super Bowl XXX, the victory screen reveals a code for the winning team, such as BYBYLA for the recently relocated Oakland Raiders.  Having both debuted in 1995, the Jacksonville Jaguars unlock an All-Madden super squad, and the Carolina Panthers unlock a playable NFLPA team made up of free agents and user created players.  Each of the established 28 teams unlock the lineup from their historical best season, ranging from the 1960 Philadelphia Eagles) to the 1986 New York Giants.  The classic teams have golden logos, historical stadiums, but the rosters consist of jersey numbers only, no names.

PlayStation version
Madden '96, developed by Visual Concepts, was originally planned to be the first NFL game on the PlayStation shortly after the console's launch in 1995. Features were to include customizable playbooks, penalties, weather conditions, and playing surfaces, and commentary from John Madden, Pat Summerall, James Brown, and Lesley Visser. But after several delays, the game was canceled because it did not meet EA's quality assurance standards. Visual Concepts would go on to make the NFL 2K series of games. 

Years after the PS1 version's cancelation a playable early development bulid of the game leaked onto the internet.

Reception
The two sports reviewers of Electronic Gaming Monthly gave the Genesis version scores of 9.5 and 9.0 out of 10, stating that "EA listened to players and has come up with the best 16-bit football game ever made." They praised the "hard as hell" AI and the addition of speed bursts. A reviewer for Next Generation deemed it "a definite improvement from last year's poor effort", citing the more solid player graphics, faster play, and tougher AI. He further remarked that while Sega's Prime Time NFL was still the best football video game in single player, Madden NFL '96 was the best two-player experience. He gave it four out of five stars. GamePro found the AI a somewhat mixed blessing, remarking that "The mean and nasty A.I. will answer the prayers of hardcore Madden players, but it will surely frustrate rookies and bandwagon fans." They also deemed the new Scouting Combine feature "an excellent idea that could nonetheless use some tinkering." However, they praised the rendered character sprites, the widened camera views, and the new moves, and gave the game a recommendation. They judged the SNES version to be superior to the Genesis version due to its faster animation and inclusion of drills specific to each position, and called it "the top-ranked SNES football cart".

GamePro panned the Game Boy version in a brief review, stating, "This Madden features no NFL license, old lineups, and none of the improvements made to the '96 SNES version. The small sprites will cause eye strain, player control is difficult, and passes sound like bombs falling from the sky." They made many of the same criticisms of the Game Gear version, which they noted had better control but was still "a below-average attempt to bring football into the handheld arena."

References

External links
 

1995 video games
Cancelled PlayStation (console) games
DOS games
EA Sports games
Game Boy games
Game Gear games
High Score Productions games
Madden NFL
Multiplayer and single-player video games
Sega Genesis games
Tiertex Design Studios games
Video games developed in the United States
Video games scored by Tommy Tallarico
Video games set in the United States